= Break beat =

Break beat may refer to:

- Breakbeat, a musical genre
- Break (music)#Breakbeat (element of music)
